Captain Sydney Tyndall Liversedge (15 August 1897 – 1979) was an English World War I flying ace credited with 13 aerial victories.

Biography
Liversedge was born in Honley, Kirklees, Yorkshire, the son of James Arthur Liversedge and Ethelinda (née Hirst). His father was a cashier at a woollen mill.

On 19 July 1917 he was commissioned from cadet to temporary second lieutenant (on probation) on the General List of the Royal Flying Corps, and was appointed a flying officer and confirmed in his rank on 31 August.

Liversedge was posted to No. 70 Squadron RFC, flying the Sopwith Camel, in March 1918, which on 1 April, following the merging of the Army's Royal Flying Corps (RFC) and the Royal Naval Air Service (RNAS) to form the Royal Air Force became No. 70 Squadron RAF. Between 6 April and 9 October, during which, on 6 September, he was promoted to acting captain, he claimed victories over 13 German aircraft. He was transferred to the RAF's unemployed list in January 1919. After the war, he worked as a mechanical engineer before he died in Huddersfield, Yorkshire, in 1979.

See also
 List of World War I aces credited with 11–14 victories

References

1897 births
1979 deaths
People from Honley
Royal Flying Corps officers
Royal Air Force personnel of World War I
British World War I flying aces